Marisa Isabel van der Meer (born 27 March 2002) is a New Zealand professional footballer who plays as a defender. She is part of the New Zealand Football team in the football competition at the 2020 Summer Olympics.

References

2002 births
Living people
New Zealand women's association footballers
New Zealand women's international footballers
Melbourne City FC (A-League Women) players
Wellington Phoenix FC (A-League Women) players
Footballers at the 2020 Summer Olympics
Olympic association footballers of New Zealand
Women's association football defenders
New Zealand people of Dutch descent